Irakli Labadze and Dušan Vemić were the defending champions, but Labadze decided to compete in Aachen, Germany at the same week.

Vemić teamed up with Daniel Melo and lost in the final to André Sá and Alexandre Simoni. The score was 3–6, 6–3, 7–6(7–3).

Seeds

Draw

Draw

References

External links
 Official results archive (ATP)
 Official results archive (ITF)

2001 in Chilean tennis